Touws River is a small railway town of 6,800 people in the Western Cape province of South Africa. The Touwsrivier CPV Solar Project is located just outside of the town and supplies 50 MW to the national electrical grid.

History

The town of Touws River owes its existence to the Cape Government Railways, and to the route that their founder, Cape Prime Minister John Molteno, chose for a railway line over the Hex River Mountains.

A railway was needed from the port at Cape Town, to service the newly discovered diamond fields in Kimberley. However, several seemingly impregnable ranges of mountains separated Cape Town from the hinterland of the Cape. The Royal Commonwealth Society (1898) records how the route was chosen:

When Mr. Molteno formulated his railway scheme he sent for his consulting engineer, who asked him what was the route he desired. Mr. Molteno asked for a map of South Africa, which was brought to him. Taking a ruler he drew his pen along it, in a direct line from Cape Town to Beaufort West. "But," said the engineer, "that means you go slap bang through the Hex River Mountains." "Never mind," said Mr. Molteno, "that is the way I want it to go." And that is the way it did go.

In 1875, the engineers of the Cape Government Railways arrived to survey the region and found that, at the exact spot indicated, there was indeed a viable route through the formidable Hex River Mountains, starting from Worcester and descending on the other side, to a spot where the town of Touws River now stands. 
On 7 November 1877, the Worcester–Matjiesfontein section of the Cape Government Railways' Cape Town–Kimberley main line was opened to traffic. The line included a station, originally named "Montagu Road", where the line bridged the Touws River. In 1883 the station was renamed "Touwsrivier". 

The name "Touws" originates from a Khoi word for ash, which also referred to the local "Ash-bushes" (Salsola aphylla). It is uncertain whether the name originally referred to the bushes, to the colour of the soil, or to the colour of the river (historically, the Touws river was occasionally known as the "Ash river"). 

The town of Touws River developed around this railway depot, at which locomotives were changed after the climb over the Hex River Pass. It was particularly busy because of the need to bank trains over the pass; banking locomotives were turned at Touws River to return to De Doorns. From 1924 it also served as the junction for the branch line to Ladismith. The closing of the Ladismith branch in 1981 and the opening of the Hex River Tunnel in 1989 reduced the importance of Touws River as a depot.

Now a sleepy town, surrounded by farms, mountains and game reserves, it preserves open-air displays of steam engines in memory of its history as a railway centre.

Governance
Touws River received municipal government in 1962; with the transformation of local government in South Africa it has been incorporated into the Breede Valley Local Municipality. It is located in ward 1 of the local municipality, which in turn falls within the Cape Winelands District Municipality.  the ward councillor was J.J. Januarie of the African National Congress.

Geography
It lies just to the south of the N1 highway,  by road from Cape Town.

Demography
Of the population, 87.7% described themselves as Coloured, 10.1% as White, 2.0% as Black African, and 0.2% as Indian or Asian. As a first language, 97.7% of the population spoke Afrikaans, 1.2% spoke English, and 0.9% spoke Xhosa. 38.6% of the population was under the age of 18.

References

Populated places in the Breede Valley Local Municipality
1877 establishments in the Cape Colony